Rafiabad (also Romanized as Rafī‘ābād) is a village in Barzavand Rural District, in the Central District of Ardestan County, Isfahan Province, Iran. At the 2006 census, its population was 18, in 4 families.

References 

Populated places in Ardestan County